Keith Frankish is a British philosopher specializing in philosophy of mind, philosophy of psychology, and philosophy of cognitive science. He is an Honorary Reader at the University of Sheffield, UK, Visiting Research Fellow with The Open University, and adjunct Professor with the Brain and Mind Programme at the University of Crete. He is known for his "illusionist" stance in the theory of consciousness. He holds that the conscious mind is a virtual system, a trick of the biological mind. In other words, phenomenality is an introspective illusion. This position is in opposition to dualist theories, reductive realist theories, and panpsychism.

Biography

Early life and education 
Born and raised near Doncaster in South Yorkshire, England, Frankish says he spent many hours alone reading due to childhood illness. His heroes were the cricketer Geoff Boycott, the fictional aviator Biggles, and the zoologist and humorous author Gerald Durrell.

His undergraduate work was done at The Open University, where he took courses in literature, ancient history, and philosophy. He contemplated becoming a classicist but was later drawn to philosophy and psychology. He chose Philosophy of Mind because it encompassed most all his previous academic interests. His postgraduate education was at the University of Sheffield. He wrote his concluding master’s thesis on Daniel Dennett’s belief/opinion distinction. He continued at Sheffield as a doctoral student, supported by a British Academy studentship. His PhD thesis, which was supervised by Peter Carruthers and Chris Hookway, "distinguished two types of belief and argued for a two-level framework for folk psychology."

While at Sheffield he held a Temporary Lectureship in the Philosophy Department, teaching courses in mind, language, and action and was closely involved in the work of the Hang Seng Centre for Cognitive Studies.

Career 
In 1999, he returned to The Open University, this time as a Lecturer in the Philosophy Department at the University’s main campus in Milton Keynes.

Frankish was a Senior Member of Robinson College, Cambridge, and acted as a Director of Studies for the college, overseeing the work of the college’s cohort of philosophy students.

He moved to Crete, Greece in 2008. In 2008-9 he was a Visiting Researcher in the Department of Philosophy and Social Studies at the University of Crete, and from 2010 he has been an Adjunct Professor with the University’s Brain and Mind Program. In 2017 he rejoined the Sheffield Philosophy Department as an Honorary Reader.

He has published and edited many books and written twelve articles in refereed journals. As of 2019, his academic papers have over 1,700 citations. In addition to his academic writing, he frequently contributes to Aeon magazine.

In 2021, he and Philip Goff, a colleague who defends the opposing view of panpsychism, started the YouTube channel "Mind Chat" on which they interview significant scientists and philosophers of consciousness, such as Tim O'Connor, Janet Levin, Christof Koch, Anil Seth, and Helen Yetter-Chappe.

Views

Illusionism 

Frankish is known for espousing the view that phenomenality is an introspective illusion. "We humans have learned a variety of subtle but powerful tricks — strategies of self-control, self-manipulation, and extended problem-solving — which vastly extend the power of our biological brains and give us the sense of having a unified, phenomenally conscious mind, self, or soul."

Early in his career he took a “robustly materialist stance” and attempted to rebut the zombie argument popularized by David Chalmers. In 2007, when he wrote the "Anti-Zombie Argument," he endorsed a weak form of realism about qualia. In later work, however, he rejected phenomenal realism altogether, arguing that “materialists should be thoroughgoing eliminativists about qualia.” He called this stance “illusionism.”

He defended this position in the 2014 ‘consciousness cruise’ off Greenland sponsored by Dimitri Volkov and the Moscow Center for Consciousness Studies. It was a floating conference that featured prominent philosophers of mind such as David Chalmers, Paul Churchland, Patricia Churchland, Andy Clark, Daniel Dennett, Philip Goff, Nicholas Humphrey, Jesse Prinz, and Derk Pereboom.

In 2016 he wrote a target article for a special issue of the Journal of Consciousness Studies, which included many responses by both supporters and critics of the position.

In 2019, William Ramsey summarized the eliminative materialist argument thusly:

In 2020, Frankish summed up the position:

Response 
In a follow up to his target article in the Journal of Consciousness Studies, Frankish summarized the reactions to his article. He labeled as "sceptics" Susan Blackmore, Nicholas Humphrey, Pete Mandik, and Eric Schwitzgebel. In the category of "opponents" he included thinkers such as Katalin Balog, Philip Goff, Martine Nida-Rümelin, and Jesse Prinz. Additionally, Paul Boghossian has argued that eliminative materialism is self-refuting, since the theory itself presupposes the existence of mental phenomena.

Jesse Prinz sought to rebut Frankish's illusionism from the perspective of reductive realism. He asserted that either illusionism collapses into realism or it introduces a deep puzzle similar to the hard problem of consciousness. Prinz concludes "that reductive realism is more compelling." Galen Strawson called it the silliest claim ever made and compared it to Flat Eartherism.

Frankish counts Daniel Dennett, Jay Garfield, Georges Rey, Amber Ross and James Tartaglia as "advocates," and amongst the "explorers" of this idea, he counts François Kammerer, Michael Graziano, Nicole Marinsek, Derk Pereboom and Michael Gazzaniga.

Other interests 
Frankish has published papers on the semantics of indirect discourse and conversational implicature (with Maria Kasmirli) and co-edited a volume of research papers in philosophy of action, New Waves in Philosophy of Action.

Conferences organized 

Frankish has co-organized two academic conferences.
 
In Two Minds conference, Cambridge 2006
An interdisciplinary conference on dual-process theories of reasoning and rationality, organized by the Department of Philosophy at the Open University, and held at Fitzwilliam College Cambridge on 5–7 July 2006.Organized by Keith Frankish and Carolyn Price of The Open University and Jonathan Evans from the University of Plymouth.

Phenomenality and Intentionality conference, Crete 2012
An international conference on the relation between the phenomenal and intentional contents of experience, co-sponsored by the University of Crete’s Brain and Mind Programme and Department of Philosophy and Social Studies and held at the Historical Museum of Crete, Heraklion, Crete, Greece, from Tuesday 12 June to Thursday 14 June 2012. Organized by Keith Frankish (The Open University & University of Crete) and Maria Venieri (The University of Crete).

Selected publications 
Books

Mind and Supermind (2004) 
Consciousness (2005) 
In Two Minds: Dual Processes and Beyond (2009) 
New Waves in Philosophy of Action (2010) 
The Cambridge Handbook of Cognitive Science (2012) 
The Cambridge Handbook of Artificial Intelligence (2014) 
Cognitive Unconscious and Human Intelligence (2016) 
Illusionism as a Theory of Consciousness (2017) 
Consciousness: The Basics (2021)

See also 
 Consciousness Explained

References 

Living people
Year of birth missing (living people)
Philosophers of mind
British cognitive scientists
20th-century British philosophers
21st-century British philosophers
Academic staff of the University of Crete